The geography of Scotland is varied, from rural lowlands to unspoilt uplands, and from large cities to sparsely inhabited islands. Located in Northern Europe, Scotland comprises the northern third of the island of Great Britain as well as 790 surrounding islands encompassing the major archipelagos of the Shetland Islands, Orkney Islands and the Inner and Outer Hebrides.

The Atlantic Ocean, which fringes the coastline of western and northern Scotland and its islands, influences the temperate, maritime climate of the country.

Scotland contains the majority of mountainous terrain in the UK. The topography of Scotland is distinguished by the Highland Boundary Fault which traverses the Scottish mainland from Helensburgh to Stonehaven. The faultline separates two distinctively different physiographic regions; namely the Highlands to the north and west and the Lowlands to the south and east. The more rugged Highland region contains the majority of Scotland's mountainous terrain, including the highest peak, Ben Nevis.

Lowland areas, in the southern part of Scotland, are flatter and home to most of the population, especially the narrow waist of land between the Firth of Clyde and the Firth of Forth known as the Central Belt. Glasgow is the largest city in Scotland, although Edinburgh is the capital and political centre of the country. While the Lowlands are less elevated, upland and mountainous terrain is located across the Southern Uplands.

An abundance of natural resources such as coal, iron and zinc contributed significantly to the industrial growth of Scotland during the 19th and early 20th centuries. Today, energy is a major component of Scotland's economy. Whilst Scotland is a large producer of petroleum, the production potential of renewable energy has emerged as an important economic and environmental issue in recent years.

Geology and morphology

The mainland of Scotland has  of coastline.

The morphology of Scotland was formed by the action of tectonic plates, and subsequent erosion arising from glaciation. The major division of Scotland is the Highland Boundary Fault, which separates the land into 'highland' to the north and west, and 'lowland' to the south and east. The Highlands of Scotland are largely mountainous, and form the highest ground in the UK: they are bisected by the Great Glen into the Grampian Mountains to the southeast and the Northwest Highlands. The Scottish Lowlands can be further subdivided into the Southern Uplands, an area of rolling farmland and high moorland, and the lowland farmland of the Central Belt and eastern Scotland.

Scotland has an incomparable variety of geology for an area of its size.

The oldest rocks of Scotland are the Lewisian gneisses, which were formed in the Precambrian period, up to 3 billion years ago. They are among the oldest rocks in the world. During the Precambrian, the Torridonian sandstones and the Moine were also laid down. Further sedimentary deposits were formed through the Cambrian period, some of which metamorphosed into the Dalradian series. The area which would become Scotland was at this time close to the south pole.

During the Silurian period (439–409 Ma), the area which became Scotland was part of the continent of Laurentia. Across the Iapetus Ocean to the south, was the continent of Baltica. The two continents gradually collided, joining Scotland to the area which would become England and Europe. This event is known as the Caledonian Orogeny, and the Highland Boundary Fault marks this stitching together of continents. Silurian rocks form the Southern Uplands of Scotland, which was pushed up from the seabed during the collision. The highlands were also pushed up as a result of this collision, and may have been as high as the modern-day Alps at this time. The Old Red Sandstones were laid down in low-lying areas during this period. Volcanic activity occurred across Scotland as a result of the collision of the tectonic plates, with volcanoes in southern Scotland, and magma chambers in the north, which today form the granite mountains such as the Cairngorms.

During the Carboniferous period (363–290 Ma), Scotland lay close to the equator. Several changes in sea level occurred during this time. The coal deposits of Lanarkshire, and further sedimentary deposits, date from this time. More volcanic activity formed Arthur's Seat in Edinburgh, among other hills. By the Triassic, Scotland was a desert, the origin of large sandstone outcrops of the southwest. Although large deposits of Cretaceous rocks would have been laid down over Scotland, these have not survived erosion, as have the chalks of England.

By the Tertiary period, the tectonic plates were again moving, separating into modern-day North America and Europe with the creation of the Atlantic Ocean. The split occurred to the west of Scotland, leaving a chain of former volcanic sites through the Hebrides, including Skye and St. Kilda. This was the last period of rock formation in Scotland.

Physical geography

Main points

The main points of the Scottish mainland are:

North: Easter Head, Dunnet Head, Caithness
East: Keith Inch, Peterhead, Aberdeenshire
South: Mull of Galloway, Dumfries and Galloway
West: Corrachadh Mòr, Ardnamurchan (headland), Lochaber

It is often yet incorrectly stated that John o' Groats is the most northerly point of mainland Scotland. The pre-Union phrase "John o' Groats to Maidenkirk" was the Scottish equivalent of the British Land's End to John o' Groats.

The extreme points of Scotland, including outlying islands, are:

North: Out Stack, north of Unst, Shetland Islands
East: Bound Skerry, Out Skerries, Shetland Islands
South: Mull of Galloway, Dumfries and Galloway
West: Either Rockall (annexed in 1972 to the former Inverness-shire), the international status of which is disputed, or Soay, St. Kilda, Western Isles

The geographical centre of Scotland lies a few miles from the village of Newtonmore in Badenoch, far to the north of the modern population heartlands. The geographical centre of the mainland alone lies near the peak of Schiehallion.

Land use
The total land area of Scotland is 8,023,947 hectares. Grasses and rough grazing account for 67% of the land area, forest and woodland 17%, urban development 8%, crops and fallow 7%, and other agricultural land accounts for 2%.

Topography, mountains and hills

Scotland contains the most mountainous terrain in Great Britain. Much of the highest uplands lie to the north and west of the Highland Boundary Fault in the Northwest Highlands and Grampian ranges. The jagged Cuillin, on the Isle of Skye, represents a major mountain range that is not located on the Scottish mainland. Ben Macdui and Braeriach are, respectively, the second and third tallest peaks in Scotland. Both are located in the Cairngorms, a mountain range in the eastern Highlands which is the highest upland area in Britain.

In the south of Scotland lie the Southern Uplands, a vast, rolling mountain chain that is less rugged and more forested than the Highlands.

There are ranges of gentler, rolling hills even in the central lowlands of Scotland. Such ranges include the Ochil Hills, near Stirling, the Campsie Fells outside Glasgow, and the Lomond Hills in Fife.

Mountains in Scotland are categorised by their height. There are 282 Munros in Scotland, all within the Highlands. The classification of peaks in Scotland is kept under periodic review by the Scottish Mountaineering Club.

Coastline

Mainland Scotland has  of coastline. The west coast in particular is heavily indented, with long promontories separated by fjordlike sea lochs. The east coast is more regular, with a series of large estuarine inlets, or firths, and long sandy beaches, for example at Aberdeen. Parts of the Scottish coastline consist of a machair formation, a dune pasture land formed as sea levels subsided.

The east coast has several significant estuaries and is home to nature reserves including the Ythan Estuary and Fowlsheugh, both of which have been designated as Important Bird Areas.

Firths around the Scottish coast include the Solway Firth, Firth of Clyde, and Firth of Lorne on the west coast, and the Cromarty Firth, Moray Firth, Firth of Tay, and Firth of Forth on the east coast. The Pentland Firth is not an inlet, but the strait that separates the Orkney Isles from the mainland.

Major sea lochs include Loch Fyne, Loch Long, Loch Ryan, Loch Linnhe, Loch Torridon, Loch Ewe and, on the Isle of Lewis, Loch Seaforth.

Islands

Scotland has over 900 islands, over 100 of which are inhabited. Most of the islands are located off the northern and western coast of the country. The northern and western islands of Scotland can be found in three main groups: Shetland, Orkney and the Hebrides which can be divided into the Inner Hebrides and the Outer Hebrides. Shetland and Orkney, together with Fair Isle and Stroma are referred to as the Northern Isles. With a total land area of  Lewis and Harris (referred to as two islands but actually just one) is the largest Scottish island.

Many of these offshore islands are swept by strong tides, and the Corryvreckan tide race between Scarba and Jura is one of the largest whirlpools in the world. Other strong tides are to be found in the Pentland Firth between mainland Scotland and Orkney, and the Grey Dog between Scarba and Lunga. There are also numerous clusters of islands in the Firth of Forth and the Firth of Clyde and in freshwater lochs such as Loch Lomond and Loch Maree. Outlying islands include St Kilda and Rockall the status of which is disputed.

Scotland's islands have a varied topography. Mull, Skye and Arran are noted for their mountainous terrain, whilst Tiree and Coll are flat or low lying. Striking topographical differences can be seen within island groups themselves; in Orkney, the Island of Hoy is hillier and more rugged than surrounding islands and Harris is distinctive in being more mountainous than the islands of Lewis, North Uist, South Uist and Barra, in the Outer Hebrides. Islay's terrain is gentle and rolling; however, its neighbour Jura is mountainous and rugged. Rùm and Eigg display jagged terrain; nearby Canna and Muck are flatter.

Rivers

The ten major rivers of Scotland, in order of length, are:
River Tay 
River Spey 
River Clyde 
River Tweed 
River Dee 
River Don 
River Forth 
River Findhorn 
River Deveron 
River Annan 

Lochs

Fresh water bodies in Scotland are known as lochs, with the exception of the Lake of Menteith and one or two-man-made "lakes". 90% of the standing fresh water volume of Great Britain lies within Scotland. Loch Lomond is the largest freshwater body in Britain by area, although with a capacity of  Loch Ness is the most voluminous. The water in Loch Ness is nearly double that of all the lakes of England and Wales combined, and is by volume the largest lake in the British Isles.
Loch Lomond 
Loch Ness 
Loch Awe 
Loch Maree 
Loch Morar 
Loch Tay 
Loch Shin 
Loch Shiel 
Loch Rannoch 
Loch Ericht

Distances to other countries
The Atlantic Ocean borders the west coast and the North Sea is to the east.

Climate

The climate of Scotland is temperate and very changeable, but rarely extreme. Scotland is warmed by the North Atlantic Drift and given the northerly location of the country, experiences much milder conditions than areas on similar latitudes, such as Labrador in Canada—where icebergs are a common feature in winter.

Average temperatures are lower than in the rest of Great Britain, with the coldest ever UK temperature of  recorded at Braemar in the Grampian Mountains, on 10 January 1982 and also at Altnaharra, Highland, on 30 December 1995. Winter maxima average , with summer maxima averaging . Western coastal areas of Scotland are warmer than the east and inland areas, due to the influence of the Atlantic currents, and the colder surface temperatures of the North Sea; however, during rare hot spells, the west is cooler than the east. Areas such as Inverewe Garden in the northwest and the Logan Botanic Garden in the southwest have warm enough microclimates to support palm trees.

Due to the mountainous topography of the western Highlands, this type of precipitation is orographic in nature, with the warm, wet air forced to rise on contact with the mountainous coast, where it consequently, cools and condenses, forming clouds. In comparison, much of eastern Scotland receives less than  annually; lying in the rain shadow of the western uplands. The town of Dunbar, east of Edinburgh, has an annual rainfall of merely 560.18 mm (22.05 in), less than Barcelona. Snowfall is less common in the lowlands, but becomes more common with altitude. Parts of the Highlands have an average of 36 to 60 snow days per year, while some western coastal areas have between 0 and 6 days with snow a year. Scotland's snowiest spot is the Cairngorm mountain range.

The Hebridean island of Tiree received a total of 329 hours of sunshine in May 1946 and again in May 1975, the highest number of sunshine hours ever recorded in one month in Scotland. On the longest day of the year there is no complete darkness over the northern isles of Scotland. Lerwick, in Shetland, has four hours more daylight at midsummer than London, although this is reversed in midwinter. Annual average sunshine totals vary from as little as 711–1140 hours in the Highlands and the north-west up to 1471–1540 hours on the extreme eastern and south-western coasts.

In common with the rest of the British Isles, wind prevails from the south-west, bringing warm, wet and unstable air from the Atlantic. The windiest areas of Scotland are in the north and west, with parts of the Outer Hebrides, Orkney and Shetland experiencing over 30 days with gales per year. Vigorous Atlantic depressions, also known as European windstorms, are a common feature of the autumn and winter in Scotland.

Human geography

According to the General Register Office for Scotland, the total population of Scotland stood at 5,168,500 in June 2008, an increase of 2.1% since the census of April 2001. Scotland's share of the United Kingdom population has been declining in recent years and stands at just over 8.5% due to differential rates of growth in the home nations. However an increasing birth rate and higher levels of inward migration to Scotland have reversed the decline and contributed to the recent population growth.

Compared with the rest of Europe, Scotland has a low population density at 65 people per square kilometre. However Scotland is a highly urbanised country, with 82% of the population living in settlements of 3,000 people or more. As a result, the majority of the population live in the Central Lowlands of Scotland, surrounding the chief cities of Glasgow and Edinburgh. Other concentrations of population include the northeast coast of Scotland – principally surrounding the city of Aberdeen and its environs – and around Inverness. With a population density of 8 people per square kilometre, the Highlands are the most sparsely populated part of the country, and one of the most sparsely populated areas in Europe. In these areas, the population is scattered in villages, small towns and isolated farmsteads or crofts.

Nearly 100 of Scotland's islands are inhabited, the most populous being Lewis and Harris with 21,031 people resident in 2011, primarily concentrated around Stornoway, the only burgh of the Outer Hebrides. Other island populations range down to very low levels on certain small isles. Between 1991 and 2001, the total number of people living on Scotland's islands fell by 3%. Conversely, islands such as Tiree, Skye and Eigg experienced increases in their respective populations over the same decade.

There are seven cities in Scotland; Glasgow, Edinburgh, Aberdeen, Dundee, Inverness, Perth and Stirling. The 2001 census identified Glasgow as being the largest city in Scotland, with a total population of 629,501, while the Scottish capital, Edinburgh had a population of 448,624, in the same year. Between 1991 and 2001, the populations of Edinburgh and Stirling grew by 2.9% and 6.5% respectively. Inverness experienced population growth of over 10% during the same period. At the same time, Glasgow, Dundee and Aberdeen all witnessed population decline. Aside from the cities, the greatest intra-census population growth was experienced in the local authorities of West Lothian, East Lothian, Aberdeenshire and Perth and Kinross. The Western Isles saw a 9.8% decrease in population between 1991 and 2001.

Political geography

The territorial extent of Scotland is generally that established by the 1237 Treaty of York between Scotland and England and the 1266 Treaty of Perth between Scotland and Norway. Exceptions include: the Isle of Man, which having been lost to England in the 14th century is now a crown dependency outside of the United Kingdom, the acquisition of Orkney and Shetland from Norway in 1472, and the permanent recovery of Berwick by England in 1482. Originally an independent country, Scotland joined with England to form the Kingdom of Great Britain in 1707 with the Acts of Union.

Between 1889 and 1975 Scotland was divided into burghs and counties, which were replaced by regions and districts. Since 1996, for the purposes of local government, Scotland has been divided into 32 council areas.

Rockall, a small and uninhabitable rocky islet in the North Atlantic, was annexed by the UK in 1955 and later declared part of Scotland by the Island of Rockall Act 1972. However, the legality of this claim is disputed by the Republic of Ireland, Denmark and Iceland and it is probably unenforceable in international law.

As one of the constituent countries of the United Kingdom, Scotland is represented by Members of Parliament at the Parliament of the United Kingdom at Westminster, London. In 1997 a referendum was held, and the people of Scotland voted for the establishment of a devolved Scottish Parliament in Edinburgh. The new parliament has the power to govern the country on Scotland-specific matters and has a limited power to vary income tax. The United Kingdom Parliament retains responsibility for Scotland's defence, international relations and certain other areas. A Scottish independence referendum was held in September 2014, at which time independence was rejected.

The latest Scottish parliament election results for major parties:
| Scottish National Party- 64 MSPs
| Scottish Conservatives- 31 MSPs
| Scottish Labour- 22 MSPs
| Scottish Greens- 8 MSPs
| Scottish Liberal Democrats- 4 MSPs

For centuries, a core aspect of Scotland's political geography has been the general divide between the Highlands and the Lowlands, a divide both physical and cultural. The physical geography of the divide (via the Highland Boundary Fault) and the political geography of the divide greatly overlap but are not identical. Despite any suggestiveness of the etymons "high" and "low", the division of Highlands and Lowlands does not thoroughly correspond either to elevation or to latitude in the sense of Northern Scotland and Southern Scotland being "upper" and "lower" (as north and south are often termed in various countries), and yet interestingly, the division does bear some noticeable degree of correspondence to both elevation and latitude, with upward and northward both tending toward stronger Highlander identity, more preservation of Gaelic versus Scots, and other political differentials (e.g., in previous centuries, degree of Unionism, degree of Jacobitism, and others).

Economic geography

The gross domestic product (GDP) of Scotland in 2006 is estimated to have been £124 billion, resulting a per capita GDP of approximately £24,000. Major industries include banking and financial services, steelmaking, transport equipment manufacturing, oil and gas, agriculture, whisky distilling, and tourism.

See also
Royal Scottish Geographical Society
Geography of the United Kingdom
Geography of England
Geography of Wales
Geography of Ireland

References